Gleek is a fictional character appearing in the animated series Super Friends and its related spin-offs. Gleek is the pet of the alien Wonder Twins, Zan and Jayna. He debuted in The All-New Super Friends Hour, which first aired September 10, 1977. Gleek's vocalizations were provided by Michael Bell, who also voiced Zan.

Fictional character biography
Gleek is a blue alien monkey and the pet of Zan and Jayna, the Wonder Twins. Gleek is often used as comic relief for the series, as the character often gets into mischief. A joke involving Gleek often ends episodes of the Super Friends in which he appears. 

Gleek helps the Wonder Twins when they need to travel: Jayna becomes an eagle, Zan becomes water, and Gleek produces a bucket to hold Zan while Jayna carries them both.

Gleek also loves Earth bananas, and in one episode, Gleek packed an extra banana suitcase for visiting their home planet, Exxor, because there are no bananas.

In one episode, other monkeys of Gleek's species appear and try to take over the world. Their leader is able to speak English apparently. They are able to brainwash Gleek and he helps them find the weaknesses of Superman, Wonder Woman, Batman and Robin.

Powers and abilities
Gleek has a stretchable, flexible tail that allows him to pick up objects and living things, such as bananas or people. He is highly intelligent, capable of understanding spoken English clearly. Gleek can communicate through the use of sign language, acting out scenes, and chattering (an alien monkey-based sound unintelligible to the audience).

Other versions
 Gleek's first comic book appearance was Super Friends Volume One, Issue #7 (October 1977, DC Comics).
 Gleek made his first modern day comic book appearance in Wonder Twins #2 (March 2019, DC Comics).

In other media
 Gleek makes a cameo appearance in the Harvey Birdman, Attorney at Law episode "Grape Juiced" as a witness during Grape Ape's trial.
 Executive producer Brian Peterson confirmed that Gleek would appear "in one shape or another" in Smallville's eighth episode of season nine, "Idol". He appeared as a decoration on Jayna's cellphone, with his laugh being the ringtone.
 Gleek appears in the Batman: The Brave and the Bold episode "The Siege of Starro!", as a stuffed animal in the Faceless Hunter's trophy room.
 Gleek appears in the Robot Chicken episode "Major League of Extraordinary Gentlemen" in the sketch "Sidekick Elevator". He is shown alongside Orko from He-Man and the Masters of the Universe and Snarf from ThunderCats, standing in an unemployment line only to be greeted by Andy Richter.
 Gleek appears alongside Zan and Jayna in Adult Swim's The New Adventures of the Wonder Twins, a series of five webisodes released in 2006.
 Gleek makes a cameo appearance in The Lego Batman Movie, at the 57th Annual Justice League Anniversary Party.
 Gleek makes a very brief off-screen cameo in the final episode of the Arrowverse crossover Crisis on Infinite Earths.

References

Fictional characters who can stretch themselves
Fictional monkeys
Super Friends characters
DC Comics characters who are shapeshifters
DC Comics extraterrestrial superheroes
Television characters introduced in 1977